No. 635 Squadron RAF was a heavy bomber squadron of the Royal Air Force during the Second World War.

History
635 squadron was formed at RAF Downham Market in Norfolk on 20 March 1944 from two flights drawn from No. 35 Squadron and No. 97 Squadron, equipped with Lancaster Mk.I bombers, as part of No. 8 Group RAF in Bomber Command. It re-equipped with Lancaster Mk.III bombers the same month, then Lancaster Mk.VI bombers in July. After the end of its bombing operations in April 1945 it was used for transport and food relief until disbanded at Downham Market on 1 September 1945.

Notable squadron members
One member of the squadron, S/Ldr. I.W. Bazalgette, was awarded a posthumous VC following the raid against Trossy-St Maximin on 4 August 1944.

Aircraft operated

Squadron bases

References

Notes

Bibliography

External links

 No. 635 Squadron RAF movement and equipment history
 History of No.'s 621–650 Squadrons at RAF Web
 A photograph of a 635 Squadron Lancaster

Bomber squadrons of the Royal Air Force in World War II
635 Squadron
Royal Air Force
Military units and formations established in 1944
Military units and formations disestablished in 1945